Fyxation is a bicycle company based in Milwaukee, Wisconsin, founded by Nick and Ben Ginster in 2009. The initial products were pedals, handlebars, saddles, and tires. This has been expanded to include frames, complete bicycles, and leather beer and wine caddies. Bicycle models include fixed-gear, cyclo-cross, and fatbikes.

Fyxation entered a distribution agreement with QBP in 2011. Fyxation opened a retail location in the Silver City section of Milwaukee, adjacent to the Hank Aaron Trail, in 2013, and they moved to the Riverwest neighborhood in the spring of 2015.

Gallery

See also 

 Milwaukee Bicycle Co.

References 

Cycle parts manufacturers
Cycle manufacturers of the United States
American companies established in 2009
Vehicle manufacturing companies established in 2009
Manufacturing companies based in Milwaukee
Milwaukee County, Wisconsin
Mountain bike manufacturers